Rolf Åke Mikael Nyqvist (8 November 1960 – 27 June 2017) was a Swedish actor. Educated at the School of Drama in Malmö, he became well known for playing police officer Banck in the 1997–1998 Martin Beck TV series and for his leading role in the 2002 film Grabben i graven bredvid. He was internationally recognized for his role as Mikael Blomkvist in the acclaimed Millennium series and as the lead villains in Mission: Impossible – Ghost Protocol (as Kurt Hendricks) and John Wick (as Viggo Tarasov). In 2004, he played the leading role in As It Is in Heaven which was nominated for Best Foreign Language Film at the 77th Academy Awards.

Early life
Rolf Åke Mikael Nyqvist was born on 8 November 1960 in Stockholm, the son of a Swedish mother and an Italian father (from Florence). As a young child, he was adopted from an orphanage. At age 17, Nyqvist spent his senior year of high school as an exchange student in Omaha, Nebraska. There, he took his first acting class and played a small part in the school's production of Death of a Salesman by Arthur Miller. He returned to Sweden and was accepted at ballet school, but gave it up after one year. An ex-girlfriend suggested he try theatre and, at age 24, was accepted to the Malmö Theatre Academy.

Career
Nyqvist's first major role was as police officer John Banck in the first set of Beck TV series in 1997. His first big breakthrough came in 2000 with the film Together directed by Lukas Moodysson.  The movie achieved great international success and earned Nyqvist his first Guldbagge Award nomination for Best Actor in a Supporting Role for his portrayal of a misguided husband with anger issues. He later played the leading man in the Swedish romantic comedy Grabben i graven bredvid for which he won a Guldbagge Award for Best Actor in Leading Role.

In 2004, he played the lead role in As It Is in Heaven as Daniel Daréus, a conductor and musician. As It Is in Heaven was nominated for an Academy Award for Best Foreign Film.  In 2006, he starred in Suddenly where Nyqvist plays Lasse – a man who must come to terms with the sudden loss of his wife and son. In the 2007 film The Black Pimpernel, Nyqvist portrays Swedish ambassador to Chile, Harald Edelstam, who helped many people flee execution by dictator Augusto Pinochet during and after the 1973 Chilean coup d'état.

Nyqvist garnered international attention starring as Mikael Blomkvist in The Girl with the Dragon Tattoo, The Girl Who Played with Fire, and The Girl Who Kicked the Hornets' Nest. These films were adapted from the Millennium series of novels by Stieg Larsson.

He starred as a terrorist in the 2011 film, Abduction, directed by John Singleton. He was also part of the permanent ensemble at the Swedish Royal Dramatic Theatre. Nyqvist appeared in the 2011 action thriller Mission: Impossible – Ghost Protocol, the fourth film of the series. In the film, Nyqvist portrays a madman code-named 'Cobalt', who wants to instigate a global war between Russia and the United States because he believes a war will restore ecological balance to the planet. In 2014, he appeared in John Wick as a New York Russian mob boss who is forced to protect his son from a legendary hit man played by Keanu Reeves. In one of Nyqvist's final roles, he starred as Russian captain Sergei Andropov, one of only three survivors of a sabotaged submarine in Hunter Killer. The movie was released posthumously on 26 October 2018. He is interviewed on the DVD and Blu-ray releases; in the section on the production of the movie.

Personal life
Nyqvist described his childhood, and his quest as an adult to find his biological parents, in his autobiographical novel, Just After Dreaming.

In 1990, he married the Finnish scenographer Catharina Ehrnrooth. They had two children—Ellen, born in 1991, and Arthur, who was born in 1996.

Death

Nyqvist died of lung cancer on 27 June 2017 in Stockholm. He was 56.

Filmography

Bibliography
 Dansa för oss (2013)
 När barnet lagt sig (2011)

References

External links

 
 Michael Nyqvist at the Royal Dramatic Theatre
 Larsson Trilogy from Quercus, publishers of Stieg Larsson
 The official Millennium site of Nordstedt Publishing 
 The Michael Nyqvist Archives – English-language website on his career

1960 births
2017 deaths
Male actors from Stockholm
Sommar (radio program) hosts
Swedish male film actors
Swedish people of Italian descent
Best Actor Guldbagge Award winners
Best Supporting Actor Guldbagge Award winners
Swedish adoptees
Deaths from lung cancer
Deaths from cancer in Sweden
Swedish expatriates in the United States